The women's 3000 metres steeplechase at the 2022 World Athletics U20 Championships was held at the Estadio Olímpico Pascual Guerrero in Cali, Colombia on 1 and 4 August 2022.

27 athletes from 21 countries were originally entered to the competition. Since only two athletes per member nation can compete in each event, the third steeplechase runner entered by the United States, Addison Stevenson, was unable to compete reducing the number of athletes to 26.

Records
U20 standing records prior to the 2022 World Athletics U20 Championships were as follows:

Results

Round 1
The round 1 took place on 1 August, with the 26 athletes involved being splitted into 2 heats of 13 athletes. The first 5 athletes in each heat ( Q ) and the next 5 fastest ( q ) qualified to the final. The overall results were as follows:

Final
The final (originally scheduled at 17:20) was started at 17:23 on 4 August. The results were as follows:

References

Steeplechase 3000 metres women
Steeplechase at the World Athletics U20 Championships